A. N. McCallum High School is a public high school in Austin, Texas, United States.

McCallum, the second oldest high school in the Austin Independent School District (formerly known as Austin Public Schools prior to desegregation in 1971), opened in 1953 to relieve growth in north and northwest Austin.  Named after AISD's first high school superintendent, A.N. McCallum, the school strives to reflect the initiatives and achievements of its namesake.

In 1994, McCallum motioned to make its campus the home of AISD's Fine Arts Academy. Currently, the Fine Arts Academy is open to all students in AISD who wish to attend, given that they are accepted following an admissions process.  Current fine arts strands include visual arts, dance, theatre (acting/performance and technical), cinematic arts, voice, and instrumental music (band, orchestra, classical guitar, and collaborative piano). The Fine Arts Academy was recently named the 2015 Grammy Foundation's National Signature School, the lone recipient out of thousands of fine arts high schools in the country. McCallum had previously ranked as a Signature School Finalist in 2005, a decade before winning the highest award possible.

Topping the list of thirteen high schools in the country, McCallum's recognition as the National Signature School earned the music program $5,000 from the Grammy Foundation and the Grammy In The Schools program. As recipient of the Foundation's Gold Award, McCallum High School earned the title of best music program in a public U.S. high school through making outstanding commitments to arts education throughout an academic school year. Student ensembles benefitting directly from this award included concert band, choral ensemble, orchestra, classical guitar ensemble, jazz band, and steel pan ensemble.

History
Plans for a new high school campus in North Austin began as early as 1947 and were formalized at the Austin School Board meeting on May 9, 1949. At that time, the only (white) high school campus in town was Stephen F. Austin High School, which, prior to expansion, was simply known as "Austin High".  With Austin High's population approaching 3000 students, the board perceived the need to expand in order to support the city's post-war population boom.  McCallum High School was designed by the architecture firm Page Southerland Page, which was founded by Charles Henry Page, and which also designed several other historic structures in the Austin area.  Construction began in March 1951 at a total cost of $1.4M, or $11.88 per square foot, and the school's first classes were held on September 8, 1953.  At its opening, initial enrollment was 1,336 students, of which 683 were in grades 9-12, and there were 62 total teaching, administrative and clerical staff.

In 1956 the first African-American student began attending McCallum as part of desegregation; a total of 13 black students attended white high schools in AISD at that time. In 1994, the Fine Arts Academy enrolled 17 students, and now has over 500 students. The Academy gained visibility as its own entity within the high school with a professionally designed logo, creation and maintenance of the Academy website, and increased social media coverage.

In 2004, McCallum High School band performed at ceremony which Mayor Will Wynn proclaimed Oct. 25 Mangiasaurus Day.

In 2009, portions of the film Bandslam featuring Vanessa Hudgens and Lisa Kudrow were filmed on the McCallum campus.

In 2011, the high school campus welcomed a new building to the campus, the "MAC" or McCallum Arts Center. This facility houses three new art classrooms and a 500-seat theatre and technical theater shop space. This was the venue used for the 20th anniversary of the Fine Arts Academy in 2014.

On May 7, 2015, nine-time Grammy award-winner Ray Benson of Asleep At The Wheel, performed at the evening reception for students, families, school administrators, and local press.

Feeder patterns
McCallum's feeder schools include Kealing, Lamar, and Webb Middle Schools.

Academics
McCallum participates in the College Board Advanced Placement (AP) program, offering approximately 25 different AP classes in addition to various dual enrollment options.  It is ranked among the top 5% of public high schools nationally by Niche and among the top 10% nationally by US News & World Report.  McCallum received the highest overall accountability rating ("A") from the Texas Education Agency with distinction designations in "Academic Achievement in English Language Arts/Reading" and "Academic Achievement in Social Studies".

Athletics
State championship appearances:
Baseball
1956 (2A), 1997 (4A)
Boys' Basketball
1966 (4A), 1992 (4A)
Boys' Golf
1980 (4A)
Volleyball
1994 (4A), 1997 (4A)

Notable alumni
Jay Arnette, basketball player (1963-1966)
Robbie Beckett, baseball player
Matt Belisle, baseball player (1998)
Andy Brown, attorney and politician (1990)
Tom Kite, professional golfer
Timothy Kopra, engineer, colonel, and astronaut (1981)
Austin Nichols, actor and director
Wiley Wiggins, game designer and film actor
Bill Zapalac, football player (1971-1973)

References

External links
 McCallum High School
 McCallum Fine Arts Academy

Class Reunion pages
 60th Anniversary Alumni Celebration Page
 1985 Reunion Page
 1988 Reunion Page

High schools in Austin, Texas
Educational institutions established in 1953
Austin Independent School District high schools
1953 establishments in Texas